John Cotes (1799-1874) was Whig MP for North Shropshire, at the time a two-member constituency, from the general election of 1832 to 1835.

His father was John Cotes (died 1821), also an MP, and his son was Charles Cecil Cotes, who also became an MP.

He is significant as the last non-Conservative MP for the constituency until the 2021 North Shropshire by-election.

Sources
brief mention in biography of his father

1799 births
1874 deaths
Politicians from Shropshire
Whig (British political party) MPs for English constituencies
UK MPs 1832–1835
Members of the Parliament of the United Kingdom for constituencies in Shropshire